The Ware were a Bantu ethnic/ linguistic group in Tanzania. They are believed to have become extinct. Around 1900, they were still living on an island in the Eastern part of Lake Victoria off the coast of Mara Region. According to Maho & Sands (2002), their language has died out as mentioned by Sommer (1992: 397). It is not known whether there are still people calling themselves "Ware" today in that area, nor which language they would be speaking.

References
Maho, Jouni & Bonny Sands. 2002. The languages of Tanzania: a bibliography. (Orientalia et africana gothoburgensia, no 17.) Göteborg: Acta Universitatis Gothoburgensis. Pp ix, 428. 
Sommer, Gabriele. 1992. "A survey on language death in Africa". In: Language death: factual and theoretical explorations with special reference to East Africa (Contributions to the sociology of language, vol 64), pp 301–417. Edited by Matthias Brenzinger. Berlin & New York: Mouton de Gruyter.

Ethnic groups in Tanzania
Extinct ethnic groups